Castanopsis sclerophylla (syn. Lithocarpus chinensis), the Chinese tanbark-oak, is a species of flowering plant in the family Fagaceae, native to southern China. 
It is an evergreen tree with glossy, thick leaves and attractive flaky bark, and reaches  in height. 

The small nuts are edible, and the Chinese process them into a foodstuff similar to tofu. It is used as a street tree in a number of Chinese cities. Hardy to USDA zone 7b, it does well in the southeastern United States, and is offered by several nurseries there under its synonym Lithocarpus chinensis.

References

sclerophylla
Trees of China
Endemic flora of China
Flora of South-Central China
Flora of Southeast China
Plants described in 1912